The Butlers Gorge Power Station is a conventional hydroelectric power station located in the Central Highlands region of Tasmania, Australia.

Technical details

Part of the Derwent scheme that comprises eleven hydroelectric power stations, the Butlers Gorge Power Station is the first station in the scheme. The power station is located aboveground at the foot of the concrete arched Clark Dam across the River Derwent that forms Lake King William. Water from the lake is fed to the power station, coupled to one of two discharge regulating valves to ensure water flow to
Tarraleah Power Station located further downstream.

The power station was commissioned in 1951 by the Hydro Electric Corporation (TAS) and officially opened on 22 November 1952. The station building houses a single alternator and the turbine has a fully embedded spiral casing with water flow controlled via a butterfly type valve. It also houses a 125 kVA diesel generator for alternate station services supply when needed. The station output, estimated to be  annually, is fed to TasNetworks' transmission grid via an 11 kV/110 kV three-phase English Electric generator transformer to the outdoor switchyard.

The water discharged from the Butlers Gorge Power Station flows via three conduits to either Nieterana mini-hydro, Tarraleah Power Station, or to Wally's Weir and back into the Derwent.

Climate 
Butlers Gorge has a temperate oceanic climate (Köppen: Cfb), bordering on a subpolar oceanic climate (Köppen: Cfc). Over the period 1957 to 1993, there were on average 27 snow days annually.

See also 

List of power stations in Tasmania

References

External links
Butlers Gorge History

Energy infrastructure completed in 1951
Central Highlands (Tasmania)
Hydroelectric power stations in Tasmania